Chichaklu (also Romanized as Chīchaklū; also known as Chechaglū, Chechak Lū, Chīchakātū, and Chīchiklu) is a village in Mahmudabad Rural District, in the Central District of Shahin Dezh County, West Azerbaijan Province, Iran. At the 2006 census, its population was 411, in 100 families.

References 

Populated places in Shahin Dezh County